Beatha Nishimwe (born 1 December 1998) is a Rwandan middle-distance runner. She competed in the 1500 metres at the 2016 IAAF World Indoor Championships without qualifying for the final.

Competition record

Personal bests
Outdoor
1500 metres – 4:17.37 (Réduit 2015)
5 kilometers - 16 : 06 (Trier 2018)

Indoor
1500 metres – 4:19.39 (Portland 2016)

References

External links

1998 births
Living people
Rwandan female middle-distance runners
People from Nyamagabe District
Athletes (track and field) at the 2018 Commonwealth Games
Commonwealth Games competitors for Rwanda
Rwandan female long-distance runners